The Global Water Security & Sanitation Partnership (GWSP), formerly the Water and Sanitation Program, is a trust fund administered by the World Bank geared at improving the accessibility and infrastructure of water and sanitation for underdeveloped countries. GWSP works in more than 25 countries through regional offices in Africa, East and South Asia, Latin America, the Caribbean, and an office in Washington, D.C. Heath P. Tarbert is the Acting Executive Director for the United States. The GWSP is best known for its work providing technical assistance, building partnerships and capacity building. GWSP focuses on both regulatory and structural changes and also behavior change projects, such as a scaling up handwashing project and scaling up sanitation project. Another key aspect of GWSP's work is sharing knowledge and best practices through multiple channels. The GWSP has determined five main focus areas: Sustainability, inclusion, institutions, financing, and resilience.

Activities 
In addition to other field projects, the program published 108 field notes and technical briefs in 2016. During this year, just under $40 billion US dollars was distributed worldwide, mostly in Africa. The program divides its efforts between the development of sanitation infrastructure and supplies and researching issues impacting the well-being of the communities lacking such facilities.

Countries affected

Africa

East Asia and the Pacific 
 Bangladesh
 Cambodia
 India
 Indonesia
 Laos
 Pakistan
 Philippines
 Vietnam

Latin America 
 Bolivia
 Ecuador
 Haiti
 Honduras
 Nicaragua
 Peru

Other Focus Areas

Ending open defecation 
The program has devoted much of its influence to ending open defecation (OD) which affects 1 billion people worldwide and ultimately leading to an estimated  842,000 deaths annually. As part of the RWSP, the WSP began extensive collecting of data in several countries to explore the factors contributing to open defecation in rural areas. The main methodology they have developed is dubbed the SaniFOAM framework. It is focused on identifying the specific practices or attitudes that need to be improved within a community and then finding solutions to influence them to ultimately end open defecation.

Rural Water and Sanitation Project (RWSP) 
The Water and Sanitation Program focused mostly on metropolitan areas. The Rural Water and Sanitation Project focuses mainly on the rural areas that don't have access to the materials that the metropolitan areas do. The RWSP expands the water and sewage infrastructure in areas that only have it in a small part of the country. The project utilizes techniques to shift behavioral habits and sanitation marketing to create a demand for products and services to improve water quality. Beginning in 2006 it was implemented India, Indonesia, and Tanzania. It has now spread to over a dozen countries.

Water Partnership Program (WPP) 
The Water Partnership Program focuses on agricultural use of water. WPP recognizes that 70% of the freshwater is being used for agricultural usage. The WPP is researching into agriculture, and taking steps to preserve fresh water from being exploited for growing crops.

Methodology

Sustainability 
The GWSP has stated that their goal is to promote and help fund private sector initiatives in countries with limited access to water. The reasoning of the GWSP behind promoting development in the private sector is that they claim private water suppliers are able to provide better access with less cost, and that the public sector lacks the resources to improve the access to water. However, there have been criticisms made about the practice of water privatization in developing nations. Some criticisms include how, for the sake of increasing profit for water corporations, these private water suppliers do not do an adequate job of developing infrastructure, and once programs to aid development end, many lower-income households are left without access to inexpensive water.

The GWSP takes steps to ensure the sustainability of water.
 Plan for the future of population growth, urbanization, and climate change
 Infrastructure built to last and be maintained

Inclusion 
The GWSP includes everyone and makes sure not to discriminate anyone from water.

Institutions 
There are set rules that institutes make. GWSP tries to figure out the rules to expand its services.

Financing 
An estimate of US$114 billion per year until 2030 has been made. To reach that goal, the GWSP is taking steps balancing sources of income, making water affordable, and keeping the viability of water is kept up.

Resilience 
Extreme weather, and climate change will effect how the GWSP runs. The steps taken to help slow down the shock is to build buildings that are more resilient to temperature change while still providing water.

History 
In an effort to improve upon water and sanitation technology for impoverished nations, the World Bank and United Nations Development Programme (UNDP) founded the program in 1978.

The program and its for bearer UNDP invested most of its efforts to testing cost-effective technologies such as hand pumps and latrines for future implementation in the 1980s. However, as other world governments and organizations began developing systemic solutions and strategies to approach issues regarding safe water and sanitation, the program followed suit in widening its scope of impact.

Beginning in the early 1990s the World Bank Water and Sanitation Program worked on sustainable solutions for communities to provide water for themselves. Their main objectives were to create systems that could stay in operation and help the communities be independent. By the end of the decade the program divided its efforts into both field projects and research and evaluation of the world's water systems and practices.

Donors 
The program is funded by several countries including Australia, Austria, Canada, Denmark, Finland, France, Ireland, Luxembourg, Netherlands, Norway, Sweden, Switzerland, United Kingdom, and United States, as well as by the Bill & Melinda Gates Foundation.

References 

Sanitation
Water supply
World Bank